John Murray Anderson (September 20, 1886 – January 30, 1954) was a Canadian theatre director and producer, songwriter, actor, screenwriter, dancer and lighting designer, who made his career in the United States, primarily in New York City and Hollywood. He worked in almost every genre of show business, including vaudeville, Broadway, and film. He also directed plays in London.

Early life and education
John Murray Anderson was born in 1886 in St. John's, Newfoundland, the son of Hon. John Anderson and his wife. His brother was Hugh Abercrombie Anderson. Anderson received his early education at Bishop Feild College in St. John's. He was sent to Europe for additional studies at Edinburgh Academy in Scotland. He entered college at the University of Lausanne in Switzerland. Later, he also studied singing with Sir Charles Stanley and art with Sir Herbert Beerbohm Tree in London.

Career

After completing studies in Europe, Anderson moved to New York City, where he became an antiques dealer. He sold collections he had accumulated in Newfoundland. This lasted a year; as Anderson said, he had "everything but customers" in his store.

In New York, Anderson quickly became involved in theatre, first as a dance instructor. He later became a writer and producer. He made his Broadway debut in 1919 wearing three hats, as writer, director, and producer of The Greenwich Village Follies. He subsequently produced new editions of the revue in each of the five succeeding years.

In the 1920s and early 1930s, with Robert Milton, Anderson ran an acting school in Manhattan, teaching Bette Davis and Lucille Ball, among others. He and Davis remained good friends. When her 1952 Broadway-bound revue Two's Company ran into problems on the road, she hired Anderson to restage it.

Anderson produced the Ziegfeld Follies in 1934, 1936, and 1943, the Harold Arlen-Ira Gershwin-E. Y. Harburg revue Life Begins at 8:40 (1934), Billy Rose's Jumbo (1935), One for the Money (1939), Two for the Show (1940), and Three to Make Ready (1946), and New Faces of 1952. He also directed productions in London; in the West End, he directed The League of Notions, Bow Bells, and Fanfare.

Anderson worked as a director at Radio City Music Hall in 1933, as director of the Casa Mañana revue at the Fort Worth Frontier Centennial in 1936, and at the Great Lakes Exposition in Cleveland, Ohio in 1937. He directed Billy Rose's Diamond Horseshoe from 1938 to 1950, and productions for Ringling Brothers Circus from 1942 to 1951.

Anderson worked in Hollywood as well. He directed the film King of Jazz (1930), wrote the screenplay for Ziegfeld Follies (1946), directed the water ballets in Bathing Beauty (1944), and directed the circus sequences in The Greatest Show on Earth (1952).

Marriage and family
In 1914, Anderson married Genevieve Lyon of Chicago; she died of tuberculosis in 1916. They had no children. Anderson regularly visited his family and friends in Newfoundland throughout his life.

Autobiography
In the year before his death, Anderson collaborated with his brother Hugh as writer. He dictated his autobiography, Out Without My Rubbers, published posthumously in 1954. He died of a heart attack in New York City on January 30, 1954.

In popular media
 Out Without My Rubbers (autobiography), 1954, New York: Library Publishers
 A musical about the life of John Murray Anderson called Impresario was written by Kyle McDavid and first performed at the LSPU Hall in St. John's, Newfoundland in May 2017.

References

External links

People educated at Edinburgh Academy
Canadian people of Scottish descent
Canadian theatre managers and producers
Burials at Woodlawn Cemetery (Bronx, New York)
Canadian theatre directors
Canadian musical theatre librettists
Canadian male songwriters
Male actors from Newfoundland and Labrador
Writers from St. John's, Newfoundland and Labrador
Pre-Confederation Newfoundland and Labrador people
1886 births
1954 deaths
Bishop Feild School alumni
Male actors from New York City
Writers from New York City
University of Lausanne alumni
Canadian male dramatists and playwrights
20th-century Canadian dramatists and playwrights
20th-century Canadian male writers